Adem Hecini (born 13 December 1975) is an Algerian athlete who specializes in the 400 and 800 metres.

In the 800 metres he won the silver medal at the 1996 African Championships, and the gold medal at the 2001 Mediterranean Games. He also competed at three World Championships (1997, 1999 and 2001) as well as the Olympic Games in 1996 and 2000 without reaching the final round. His personal best time is 1:44.59 minutes, achieved in August 1997 in Zürich.

In 2002 he finished fourth at the 2002 African Championships, and was selected to represent Africa in 4 × 400 metres relay at the 2002 IAAF World Cup. The African team, with Adem Hecini, Sofiane Labidi, Fernando Augustin and Eric Milazar, won the bronze medal. He also competed at the 2004 Olympic Games. His personal best time is 45.63 seconds, achieved in September 2003 in Amman.

References

External links
 

1975 births
Living people
Algerian male sprinters
Algerian male middle-distance runners
Athletes (track and field) at the 1996 Summer Olympics
Athletes (track and field) at the 2000 Summer Olympics
Athletes (track and field) at the 2004 Summer Olympics
Olympic athletes of Algeria
Mediterranean Games gold medalists for Algeria
Mediterranean Games medalists in athletics
Athletes (track and field) at the 2001 Mediterranean Games
21st-century Algerian people
20th-century Algerian people